Stearman is a surname. Notable people with the name include:

 Lloyd Stearman (1898–1975),  American aviation pioneer
 Richard Stearman (born 1987), English footballer
 William Stearman (1813–1846) English cricketer
 William L. Stearman (born 1922), American government official, aviator and author

See also
 Stearman Aircraft, a company founded by Lloyd Stearman
 Boeing-Stearman Model 75, a Stearman Aircraft biplane trainer commonly known eponymously as a Stearman
Sterman, a surname
Stermann, a surname